Kabi Nazrul Government College (KNGC) is a governmental college located in Laxmi Bazar, Dhaka, the capital of Bangladesh. It was formerly known as Govt. Kabi Nazrul College.

It offers higher secondary education (HSC). It has bachelor's degree and master's degree programmes as well; these divisions are affiliated with the University of Dhaka.

Academics
Kabi Nazrul Government College offers Higher Secondary Certificate, four year honours and one year master's courses in various majors.

Faculty of Science
 Botany
 Chemistry
 Geography & Environment
 Mathematics
 Zoology
 Physics

Faculty of Arts and Social Science
 Arabic
 Bengali
 Economics
 English
 History
 Islamic History and Culture
 Islamic Studies
 Philosophy
 Physical Exercise
 Political Science
 Sociology

Faculty of Business Studies
 Finance and Banking
 Accounting
 Management
 Marketing

History
In 1874, Mohasania Madrasah was established by a grant from the Mohsin Fund. It was built on the model of Calcutta Alia Madrasah (now Aliah University). The institute was later known as Dhaka Madrasah. In 1915, it became Dhaka High Madrasah. In 1916, the Anglo-Persian department became a separate school named Dhaka Government Muslim High School.

After the establishment of University of Dhaka in 1921, the school was upgraded into a college and renamed to Islamic Intermediate College. In 1968, the college section was named Government College Dhaka in 1972, the college was given its current name.

Library
It has a library facility for students. It is located on the 2nd floor of the 3rd building. This library has 40,000+ books and 2,000+ journals. Apart from that there's a newspaper corner where students can read Bengali and English daily newspapers. For studying in the library students have to issue a library card. They can also borrow books from the library to their home. The library is open daily from 8.30 a.m. till 3.30 p.m.

Medical service
For medical help there's a medical centre in the college. It's totally free of cost and open for the students.

Hall of residence
There's only one hall accommodated for boys. There's no hall for girls.
 Shahid Shamsul Alam Hall

Canteen
Giving students food at a bare minimum cost the college has its own canteen. It is located in the middle of Shahid Minar and the Faculty of Science Building.

Landmarks

References

Universities and colleges in Dhaka
Educational institutions established in 1874
Schools in Dhaka District
1874 establishments in India
Kazi Nazrul Islam
University of Dhaka affiliates